Woodvale may refer to:

Places

Australia
 Woodvale, Victoria, a locality
 Woodvale, Western Australia, a suburb of Perth

United Kingdom
 Woodvale, Belfast, Northern Ireland, a suburb of Belfast
 Belfast Woodvale (Northern Ireland Parliament constituency)
 Belfast Woodvale (UK Parliament constituency), a constituency from 1918 to 1922
 Woodvale, Merseyside, England, a village

Elsewhere
 Woodvale, an estate in the Blanchardstown area of Dublin, Ireland
 Woodvale, Edmonton, Alberta, Canada, a suburb of Edmonton 
 Woodvale Historic District, Pennsylvania, United States

Other

 RAF Woodvale, a Royal Air Force airfield, located in Merseyside, England